The Department of Infrastructure, Transport, Cites and Regional Development was an Australian Public Service department of the Government of Australia that existed between May 2019 and January 2020, charged with the responsibility for infrastructure and major projects, transport, local government, external territories administration, rural and regional development, population policy, and cities.

When created on 29 May 2019, the department replaced the Department of Infrastructure, Regional Development and Cities. The department was merged with the Department of Communications and the Arts in January 2020 to form a "superdepartment", the Department of Infrastructure, Transport, Regional Development and Communications.

Location
The department was headquartered in the Canberra central business district at Infrastructure House and the neighbouring building to Infrastructure House.

Structure and audit of expenditure
The department was administered by a senior executive, comprising a Secretary and several Deputy Secretaries.

The department's financial statements were audited by the Australian National Audit Office.

References

Australia, Infrastructure, Transport, Cities and Regional Development
2019 establishments in Australia
Infrastructure in Australia
Regions of Australia
Defunct government departments of Australia
2020 disestablishments in Australia